Steve Henshaw (died 7 June 1989) was an English professional motorcycle racer and working motorcycle mechanic.

Born in Nottingham, East Midlands, Henshaw began racing at the nearby club circuit at Darley Moor in Derbyshire, progressing to circuits like Mallory Park and twice winning the Scarborough Gold Cup held at the Oliver's Mount race circuit.

Henshaw's road racing career included racing on both street circuits and race circuits. His road race entries included a total of 23 appearances at the Isle of Man TT from 1981–1989. He made one appearance in the Grand Prix world championships finishing in 17th place at the 1983 British Grand Prix.

Henshaw died after an accident at Quarry Bends during the 1989 Isle of Man TT races. When trying to avoid fallen James Whitham, Henshaw and Mike Seward touched trying to avoid the debris, and Henshaw was killed instantly in the crash. Henshaw was married to Val.

The popular Nottinghamshire man has a Trophy named in his honour at the Gold Cup races held at Oliver's Mount, a road-based circuit through parkland near the Yorkshire east coast holiday resort of Scarborough.

See also
 List of Snaefell Mountain Course fatalities

References

1954 births
1989 deaths
Sportspeople from Nottingham
English motorcycle racers
500cc World Championship riders
Isle of Man TT riders
Motorcycle racers who died while racing
Sport deaths in the Isle of Man